Year 294 (CCXCIV) was a common year starting on Monday (link will display the full calendar) of the Julian calendar. At the time, it was known as the Year of the Consulship of Constantius and (Galerius) Maximianus (or, less frequently, year 1047 Ab urbe condita). The denomination 294 for this year has been used since the early medieval period, when the Anno Domini calendar era became the prevalent method in Europe for naming years.

Events 
 By place 
 Asia 
 Persian shahanshah Narseh defeats King Tiridates III of Armenia, and forces him to flee to the Roman Empire.
 Tuoba Luguan succeeds his nephew Tuoba Fu, as chieftain of the Chinese Tuoba clan.

Births 
 Sima Bao, Chinese prince of the Jin Dynasty (d. 320)

Deaths 
 Tuoba Fu, chieftain of the Chinese Tuoba clan

References